WAFS (1190 kHz) is an AM radio station licensed to Atlanta, Georgia that broadcasts Catholic talk programming, as an affiliate of Relevant Radio. The station is classified as a Class D AM broadcast station according to the Federal Communications Commission, with 25,000 watts of power during the daytime using a non-directional antenna. WAFS also operates pre-sunrise (PSRA) with 350 watts and post-sunset (PSSA) with power levels from 54 to 150 watts. (WNIV, AM 970 kHz, broadcasts from the same tower as WAFS using an antenna diplexing system.)

History

WGKA
The station was first licensed on January 24, 1956 as WGKA, transmitting on  1600 AM. In its earliest days, WGKA was owned by Glenkaren Associates, headed by Locke E. Glenn, hence the acronym.  Glenkaren Associates also owned a hi-fi audio store adjoining the radio station. In 1967, the station moved to 1190 kHz under the supervision of Chief Engineer, Lewis Edge.  Shortly afterward, the station's Chief Engineer installed a new stereo transmitter and a 150' tower erected on the roof of the Peachtree Center Building.  Studios were also moved from the building housing the hi-fi audio store to the Peachtree Center Building.

Like WGKA AM, WGKA-FM 92.9 was a classical-music station in Atlanta from the 1950s to 1971.  Although it existed in the days before NPR, it occasionally carried programs which were not locally produced, such as BBC Music Showcase, hosted by British composer/lecturer Antony Hopkins (not to be confused with film actor Anthony Hopkins). Several of the hosts who once worked at the station, such as Jonathan Phelps and David Jacobs, switched to working at WABE FM when WGKA-FM was sold and their program format changed. Lee Nance and Arthur Borgeson were also hosts.  The station's call letters also changed to WZGC, which still exists on 92.9 today.

WGKA was later sold to Salem Communications.

WAFS

On March 24, 2004 the Moody Bible Institute sold their station, WAFS on 920 kHz, to Salem Communications. Salem next swapped the call letters between WGKA and WAFS, effective August 2, 2004, resulting in the WAFS call moving to 1190 kHz, and the WGKA call letters transferring to 920 kHz.

In July 2006, Salem entered a Local marketing agreement (LMA) that changed the station's format to Spanish Tropical under the brand of "Mega 1190".  However, the arrangement was abruptly pulled by Salem in February 2007 due to a dispute with the LMA. WAFS then switched to a Spanish language Christian format with "Radio Luz" branding until April 2010.

On April 6, 2010, the format was changed again, to a business news and talk radio format with "Biz 1190" branding, carrying programming from the Bloomberg Radio network.

On August 15, 2019, Salem announced the sale of WAFS and eight other stations to Immaculate Heart Media for $8.7 million. The sale was consummated in November 2019, and it became an affiliate of Relevant Radio.

References

External links

FCC History Cards for WAFS (covering 1955-1979 as WGKA)

AFS
Radio stations established in 1956
Relevant Radio stations
AFS